Haripura is a village located near Kadod town in the Surat district of Gujarat, India. It is around 13 kilometres north east of Bardoli. During the Indian independence movement, it was the venue of annual session of the Indian National Congress in 1938, referred as the 'Haripura Session'.

Haripura is surrounded by villages including Mori, Samthan, Kadod, and Kosadi.

Geography
Haripura is located on the banks of the Tapti River.

History

Haripura was safe because of its geographical height during great 1968 Tapti flood.

The Indian National Congress met at Haripura during 19 to 22 February 1938, under the presidency of Subhas Chandra Bose; he was elected President of the Haripura Congress Session in 1938. Sardar Vallabhbhai Patel had selected Haripura for the convention. 51 Bullocks'chariot was decorated and sent for this very occasion by the then Maharajasaheb Shri Indrasinhji Pratapsinhji Solanki of Vansda state. Noted painter, Nandalal Bose also created  set of seven posters at the request of Mahatma Gandhi for the Haripura Session, while film director, JBH Wadia, of Wadia Movietone Studio, made a feature-length documentary of the Haripura Congress.

Visitor's attractions
A Krishna temple and a statue of Subhas Chandra Bose are located in this village.

Gallery

References

See also 
List of tourist attractions in Surat

Suburban area of Surat
Villages in Surat district
Indian National Congress
History of Gujarat